Guadalupe Island is a volcanic island located  off the western coast of Mexico's Baja California Peninsula and about  southwest of the city of Ensenada in the state of Baja California, in the Pacific Ocean. The various volcanoes are extinct or dormant. In 2005 Guadalupe Island and its surrounding waters and islets were declared a biosphere reserve to restore its vegetation (decimated by feral goats) and to protect its population of marine mammals and birds. The island is a popular destination for great white shark cage diving. Guadalupe Island is inhabited only by scientists, military personnel operating a weather station, and a small group of seasonal fishermen. The island is mostly arid and has very little surface water.

The two other Mexican island groups in the Pacific Ocean that are not on the continental shelf are the Revillagigedo Islands and Rocas Alijos. Guadalupe Island and its islets are the westernmost region of Mexico.

Discovery and history
The first known sighting of Guadalupe Island was in 1602 when a Spanish expedition headed by Sebastián Vizcaíno sailed by but did not land on the island. In the late 18th and 19th centuries the island was frequently visited by fur seal, otter, and elephant seal hunters. Goats were probably introduced by seal hunters in the early 1800s and quickly increased their numbers, nearly eradicating the indigenous vegetation.

Administration and population
The 2010 census recorded a population of 213 people on the island. In 2015, it was estimated to have fewer than 150 permanent residents. Guadalupe is part of Ensenada delegación, one of the 24 delegaciones or subdivisions of Ensenada Municipality of the Mexican state of Baja California. Ensenada delegación and Chapultepec delegación together form the city of Ensenada, the municipal seat of the namesake municipality. The postal code of Guadalupe Island is 22997.

Campo Oeste ("West Camp", also called Campo Tepeyac, with 15 buildings) is a small community of abalone and lobster fishermen, located on the western coast, specifically on the north side of West Anchorage, a bay that provides protection from the strong winds and swells that whip the islands during winter. Generators provide electricity, and a military vessel brings  of freshwater. The number of fishermen varies annually depending on the fishing season. Ten months of the year the 30 families of the fishing cooperative "Abuloneros and Langosteros of Guadalupe Island" are present.

Additional temporary fishing camps are Campo Norte ("North Camp", four buildings), Campo Lima (Campo Corrals) (one building) and Arroyitos (four buildings).

At the southern tip, on Melpómene Cove, there is a weather station staffed by a detachment from the Mexican Ministry of the Navy. The site is called Campamento Sur ("South Encampment").

Campo Bosque was established as a temporary camp in 1999 in the cypress forest in the north. The camp houses members of the Cooperative Farming Society "Francisco Javier Maytorena, S.C. of R.L." and removes goats from the island and sells them in the State of Sonora, with permission of Secretariat of the Environment and Natural Resources (SEMARNAT) and the support of the Secretariat of the Navy.

Campo Pista is located at the small airport, near the center of the island (elevation: 592 m, direction: 05/23). Airport Isla Guadalupe (ICAO Code MMGD) has a  runway. At the end of the runway near threshold 5 is the wreckage of a Lockheed Model 18 Lodestar, which overshot the runway during landing. A North American B-25J-30/32 Mitchell, BMM-3501 (c/n 44-86712), bomber wrecked on the opposite end of the runway, after suffering serious damage in trying to take-off overloaded. The B-25 wreckage was removed between October 2005 and June 2006.

Because Guadalupe Island is located within a biosphere reserve, anyone visiting the island must obtain a permit from the Mexican government; this means the communities on the island are closed towns.

Geology

Guadalupe Island has a rugged landscape composed of two shield volcanoes which formed on a now extinct mid-ocean ridge. They are overlain by lava flows and cinder cones that were emplaced along northwest-southeast and northeast-southwest trending fissure vents. The youngest shield volcano comprises the northern end of the island and may have formed during the Holocene epoch. A series of very fresh-looking alkali basalt flows along with trachyte domes in the northern shield volcano caldera represent the most recently formed rocks on Guadalupe Island.

Geography
Its smaller counterpart on the southern end is the  El Picacho. The southern part of the island is mostly barren, but there are scattered stands of trees at higher elevations of the northern part of the island and in the Twin Canyon area on the northeast coast. The coast generally consists of rocky bluffs with detached rocks fronting some of them. Two high and prominent islets are within  of the southwestern end of the island, separated from one another by a gap called Tuna Alley:
 Islote Afuera (Outer Islet, also Islote Zapato), the most distant, steep with almost vertical walls above and below water
 Islote Adentro (Inner Islet, also El Toro), with two smaller islets nearby:
 Church Rock
 Roca del Skip

 Islote Negro, to the southwest
 Roca Hundida, to the southwest
 Islote Bernal, to the southwest
 Steamboat Rock, to the west
 Roca Elefante, to the northwest (the westernmost)
 Roca Elefante is the westernmost point in both Mexico and Latin America.

Climate

Most precipitation occurs over the winter months with a strong influence of northwestern winds and cyclones.

Rainfall averages  near sea level at the south end, but appears to be much more at the high north end. An estimate for the rainfall in the northern highlands is possible by way of taking Pinus radiata as an indicator, which is native to that area of the island. The effective moisture is much greater because of fog drip.

Ecology

Guadalupe Island was a major destination for Russian and American fur hunters seeking the Guadalupe fur seal (Arctocephalus townsendi) in the 18th and 19th centuries. Captain Auguste Duhaut-Cilly reported in 1827 that a Sandwich Islands (Hawaiian Islands) brig "had spent several months there and collected three thousand sealskins". The northern elephant seal (Mirounga angustirostris) was also ruthlessly hunted for the oil in its blubber.

Northern elephant seals were thought to be extinct by 1884 until a remnant population of eight individuals was discovered on Guadalupe Island in 1892 by a Smithsonian expedition, which promptly killed several of them for their collections. The northern elephant seals managed to survive, and were finally protected by the Mexican government in 1922.

Guadalupe shares the California chaparral and woodlands ecoregion with the Channel Islands of California in the United States, but the island was at one time practically denuded of all plants higher than a few centimeters by up to 100,000 feral goats.

Originally brought to the island in the 19th century by European whalers and sealers for provisions when stopping over, the population eventually eliminated most vegetation; the number of feral goats declined to a few thousand. Before this collapse, the main impact of the feral goat population was about the turn of the 19th/20th century. Naturalist A. W. Anthony wrote in 1901:
"It is directly due to the despised Billy-goat that many interesting species of plants formerly abundant are now extinct, and also that one or more of the birds peculiar to the island has disappeared, and others are following rapidly."

After the crash, the feral goat population once again grew, this time more slowly, until it had reached the new, lower carrying capacity at maybe 10,000–20,000 in modern times. The island had been a nature conservancy area since August 16, 1928, making it one of the oldest reserves in Mexico. Extirpation of the feral goats was long envisioned, but logistical difficulties, such as island size and lack of suitable spots for landing and encamping hunters and material, prevented this. In 2002, the Mexican government (including SEMARNAT) and the conservation group Grupo de Ecología y Conservación de Islas began extirpating the feral goats. In June 2005, after many years of false starts, the Mexican government had almost completed a round-up and evacuation of the remaining feral goat population. In 2007, the feral goat extirpation program ended (10,000 feral goats were extirpated). Guadalupe Island was designated a biosphere reserve on April 25, 2005.

French sea captain Auguste Duhaut-Cilly remarked on the tall trees on the north of Guadalupe Island as he sailed past on January 2, 1827. Of the four large tree species on Guadalupe Island (the Guadalupe palm, Guadalupe cypress, island oak, and Monterey pine), there were only old individuals left; the California juniper population had entirely disappeared. As the feral goats ate any seedlings that managed to germinate, no regeneration of trees was possible. Water, formerly plentiful as the common fogs condensed in the forests of the northern end of the island, today only occurs in a few scattered pools and springs. Because the springs were a critical emergency water supply for the human inhabitants, protective measures including feral goat fences were installed beginning in 2000, allowing new seedlings of many species to survive for the first time in 150 years. Seacology, a non-profit environmental group located in Berkeley, CA, provided funding to the Island Conservation & Ecology Group for the construction of 10 fenced exclosures to keep feral goats out of the most sensitive areas of Guadalupe Island.

In November 1850, U.S. Army Lt. George H. Derby passed the island on his expedition in the U.S. Transport Invincible.  He described it thus: "This island is about 15 miles length and 5 in width.  It is rocky + mountainous but capped with vegetation and is reputed to be thickly inhabited by wild goats of unusual size.  Water is found upon the eastern shore and the Island is frequently visited by small vessels engaged in the capture of the sea elephant numbers of which animals are found upon its coast."

Many islands or marine species that reside on or near Guadalupe also frequent the Channel Islands, and vice versa. In stark contrast to the rampant extinction of terrestrial life that happened at the same time, Guadalupe was the last refuge for the northern elephant seal (Mirounga angustirostris) and the Guadalupe fur seal (Arctocephalus townsendi) in the 1890s. The island has been a pinniped sanctuary since 1975.

The movement of the cool, nutrient-rich water current promotes phytoplankton production and attracts both coastal and deep-water species, including great white sharks.

Guadalupe is considered one of the best spots in the world for sightings of the great white shark, possibly because of its large population of pinnipeds. The island has been recognised as an Important Bird Area (IBA) by BirdLife International.

Habitat types
Before the extirpation of the feral goats, surveys found eight major land habitats on Guadalupe:

Largely unresearched due to difficult access, the cliffs might even harbor remnant specimens of the presumably extinct plants.
 Succulent perennial herbs:  ASL, chiefly on the southern end and on the offshore islets, and in less steep areas towards sea level. Here, the highest number of endemic plants exist. Baeriopsis guadalupensis, Cistanthe guadalupensis, Dudleya guadalupensis, Hemizonia greeneana ssp. greeneana, H. palmeri, Perityle incana and Stephanomeria guadalupensis are dominant endemics, and giant coreopsis (Coreopsis gigantea), a non-endemic native species, is also abundant.
 Arid maritime shrubland:  ASL. Mainly in the southern portion around El Picacho. Native species occurring here include Ambrosia camphorata, Atriplex barclayana, Cylindropuntia prolifera and California boxthorn (Lycium californicum); none of these is endemic.
 Herbland dominated by introduced plants:  ASL, mainly on the central plateau. This habitat is almost entirely a consequence of overgrazing; hardly anything of the original ecosystem remains. Dominant introduced plants are Avena barbata, Bromus berteroanus, great brome (B. diandrus), soft brome (B. hordeaceus sspp. hordaceus and mollis), red brome (B. madritensis ssp. rubens), tocalote (Centaurea melitensis), nettle-leaved goosefoot (Chenopodium murale), Filago californica, wall barley (Hordeum murinum sspp. glaucum and leporinum), crystalline iceplant (Mesembryanthemum crystallinum), M. nodiflorum, Polypogon monspeliensis and Sisymbrium orientale. The non-endemic natives dwarf coastweed (Amblyopappus pusillus), island false bindweed (Calystegia macrostegia ssp. macrostegia), Cryptantha maritima var. maritima, Filago arizonica, Gilia nevinii, California goldfields (Lasthenia californica), Pectocarya palmeri and Perityle emoryi as well as the endemics Cryptantha foliosa and Sphaeralcea palmeri can be found here also; some are still numerous. This probably was a mesic shrub/herbland before the goats destroyed the upland forest, upsetting the water supply. Native plants still found on Guadalupe, like Crossosoma californicum, laurel sumac (Malosma laurina) and the endemic Camissonia guadalupensis ssp. guadalupensis, presumably thrived here in former times, as would have such taxa as the native hoary-leaved ceanothus (Ceanothus crassifolius), wedge-leaved ceanothus (C. cuneatus) – and possibly also felt-leaved ceanothus (C. arboreus), which was found in 2001–2003 surveys –, Cammisonia robusta, red-flowering currant (Ribes sanguineum) and the endemic Hesperelaea palmeri, which have now disappeared from the island.
 Guadalupe palm groves:  ASL on the northwest side of the island. There are hundreds of palm trees remaining, mainly in a single patch of this habitat. At least one other major palm forest existed at the western coast; it was still present in 1906 at "Steamer Point". As reproduction is presumably still ongoing, the species will likely recover in due time.
 Guadalupe cypress forest:  ASL. Presently some 4,000 old trees, essentially limited to the central-northern part. Other cypress forests, such as a major stand NE of the present patch which was still extant in 1906, were destroyed by the goats early in the 20th century. There is still reproduction, but the water table appears to have declined to below the level required by the cypresses, and mortality of the old trees is high and can be expected to continue even after the removal of the goats.
 Guadalupe palm – island oak – Monterey pine woodland:  ASL. This habitat has all but disappeared during the 20th century, due to the decline in numbers of the oaks and pines.
 Guadalupe pine cloud forest with some island oak: restricted to above  ASL on the N-NE point of the island. The population of the pine has declined by about two-thirds during the last 35 years; it presently stands at about 130 old trees in the main population and about the same number scattered elsewhere. Reproduction is ongoing, with several hundred seedlings having successfully established themselves since 2000, and with the elimination of goat browsing, the pines will likely make a full recovery. The situation of the oak is direr; there are only 20 trees or so remaining (by about 1950, there were 100) and they appear past reproductive age. Not being restricted to Guadalupe, seedlings could be imported from elsewhere.

A ninth habitat type, California juniper woodland and extending on the central plateau below the cypress forest, was entirely gone by 1906. What other endemic lifeforms underwent coextinction with it will forever remain unknown.

Endemism
Animals:

 Guadalupe fur seal (Arctocephalus townsendi) – only major breeding site
 Townsend's storm petrel (Hydrobates socorroensis) – only known breeding site

 Ainley's storm petrel (Hydrobates cheimomnestes) – only known breeding site
 Guadalupe rock wren (Salpinctes obsoletus guadalupensis) – endemic
 Guadalupe house finch (Haemorhous mexicanus amplus) – endemic
 Guadalupe pipefish (Syngnathus insulae) – endemic
 Guadalupe junco (Junco insularis) – endemic
 Guadalupe caracara (Caracara lutosa) – endemic, extinct
 Guadalupe Bewick's wren (Thryomanes bewickii brevicauda) – endemic, possibly extinct
 Endemic spiders:
 Habronattus gigas
 Herpyllus giganteus
 Kibramoa isolata
 Sergiolus guadalupensis

Plants:
 Baeriopsis guadalupensis – near-endemic
 Brahea edulis (Guadalupe palm) – effectively endemic
 Camissonia guadalupensis ssp. guadalupensis – endemic
 Castilleja fruticosa – endemic
 Cistanthe guadalupensis – endemic
 Cupressus guadalupensis var. guadalupensis (Guadalupe cypress) – endemic
 Cryptantha foliosa – endemic
 Deinandra frutescens – endemic
 Deinandra greeneana ssp. greeneana – endemic
 Deinandra palmeri – endemic
 Dudleya guadalupensis – endemic
 Dudleya virens ssp. extima – endemic
 Eriogonum zapatoense – endemic
 Erysimum moranii – endemic
 Eschscholzia elegans – near-endemic
 Eschscholzia palmeri – endemic
 Galium angulosum – endemic
 Githopsis diffusa var. guadalupensis – endemic
 Hemizonia frutescens – endemic
 Hemizonia greeneana ssp. greeneana – endemic
 Hemizonia palmeri – endemic
 Heteromeles arbutifolia var. macrocarpa – probably endemic
 Lavatera lindsayi – endemic
 Lupinus niveus – endemic
 Marah guadalupensis – near-endemic or endemic
 Perityle incana – endemic
 Phacelia phyllomanica – endemic
 Pinus radiata var. binata (Guadalupe Monterey pine) – near-endemic or endemic
 Satureja palmeri – endemic; rediscovered in 2001–2003 surveys
 Senecio palmeri – endemic
 Sphaeralcea palmeri – endemic
 Sphaeralcea sulphurea – endemic
 Stephanomeria guadalupensis – endemic
 Triteleia guadalupensis – endemic

Extinctions
Numerous taxa have gone extinct due to the habitat destruction by the feral goats, which in turn rendered the endemic fauna vulnerable to predation by introduced feral cats and adverse weather by depriving them of shelter.

There have been 5–6 extinctions of birds:
 Guadalupe Bewick's wren (Thryomanes bewickii brevicauda), the late 1890s
 Guadalupe spotted towhee (Pipilo maculatus consobrinus), the late 1890s
 Guadalupe caracara (Caracara lutosa), 1906 – intentionally made extinct by humans, ironically because it occasionally preyed on young goats
 Guadalupe red-shafted flicker (Colaptes auratus rufipileus), 1906 – the island was later recolonized by individuals of an extant mainland red-shafted northern flicker subspecies (which one is unknown)
 Guadalupe storm petrel (Hydrobates macrodactyla), the 1910s
 Guadalupe ruby-crowned kinglet (Corthylio calendula obscurus) – close to extinction (if, indeed, it still exists); it was not observed in 2000, despite thorough searches

Globally extinct plant taxa from Guadalupe Island are:
 Castilleja guadalupensis
 Hesperelaea palmeri
 Pogogyne tenuiflora
and one species of plant incertae sedis

Notes

Its time zone is Pacific Standard Time

References

External links
 Sailing directions, with geographical information
 Photographs of Isla Guadalupe and sea life
 Seacology Guadalupe Island Project – updates on ecosystem

Islands of Ensenada Municipality
California chaparral and woodlands
Ecoregions of Mexico
Volcanoes of Baja California
Volcanoes of the Pacific Ocean
Important Bird Areas of Mexico
Important Bird Areas of Oceania
Endemic Bird Areas
Populated places in Mexico